Of the religions in Tunisia, Islam is the most prevalent. It is estimated that approximately 99% of Tunisia's inhabitants identify themselves as Muslims.

The country also includes Christian, Jewish, and Baháʼí communities. While the Tunisian constitution declares Islam the state religion, it also provides for religious freedom, but the law places restrictions on that freedom.

Tunisia has a reputation for tolerance and openness to other cultures that have made the country's identity.

Faiths

Islam

The majority of Tunisians consider themselves to be Muslim, who according to the Pew Research Center 58% identify themselves as Sunni Muslims, while 40% say they are only Muslims without affiliation to any sect.

The government controls and subsidizes mosques and pays the salaries of prayer leaders. The President appoints the Grand Mufti of the Republic. The 1988 Law on Mosques provides that only personnel appointed by the Government may lead activities in mosques and stipulates that mosques must remain closed except during prayer times and other authorized religious ceremonies, such as marriages or funerals. Some people may be interrogated just for associating or being seen in the street with practicing Muslims. New mosques may be built in accordance with national urban planning regulations; however, upon completion, they become the property of the Government. The Government also partially subsidizes the Jewish community.

There is a small indigenous Sufi Muslim community; however, there are no statistics regarding its size. Reliable sources report that many Sufis left the country shortly after independence when their religious buildings and land reverted to the government (as did those of Orthodox Islamic foundations). Although the Sufi community is small, its tradition of mysticism permeates the practice of Islam throughout the country.  There is a small indigenous "Maraboutic" Muslim community that belongs to spiritual brotherhoods known as "turuq". The Muslim holidays of Eid al-Adha, Eid al-Fitr, and Mawlid are considered national holidays in Tunisia.

Christianity

The International Religious Freedom Report of 2007 reported that the Christian community numbered 25,000 people, 20,000 of whom were Catholics, and was composed of indigenous Berber residents, Tunisians of Italian and French descent, and a large group of native-born citizens of Arab descent, dispersed throughout the country. In the Annuario Pontificio of 2018, the number of Catholics is estimated to have risen to 30,700.

Christianity came in Tunisia during Roman rule. However, after the arrival of Islam, the population of Christians decreased in the country.

From the late 19th century to after World War II, Tunisia was home to large populations of Christian French, Italian and Maltese descent (255,000 Europeans in 1956).

The Roman Catholic Church in Tunisia, which forms the Archdiocese of Tunis, operates 12 churches, 9 schools, several libraries, and 2 clinics. In addition to holding religious services, the Catholic Church opened a monastery, freely organized cultural activities, and performed charitable work throughout the country. According to church leaders, there are 2,000 practising Protestant Christians. The International Religious Freedom Report for 2007 estimates thousands of Tunisian Muslims have converted to Christianity. The Russian Orthodox Church has approximately 100 practising members and operates a church in Tunis and another in Bizerte. The Reformed Church of France maintains a church in Tunis, with a congregation of 140 primarily foreign members. The Anglican Church has a church in Tunis with several hundred predominantly foreign members. There are 50 Seventh-day Adventists. The 30-member Greek Orthodox Church maintained 3 churches (in Tunis, Sousse, and Djerba). Occasionally, Catholic and Protestant groups held services in private residences or other locations. Scattered among the various churches, though mostly evangelical, are also a number of Christian believers from Muslim backgrounds. A 2015 study estimates some 500 such individuals in Tunisia.

Judaism

Judaism is the country's fourth largest religion with 1,500 members. One-third of the Jewish population lives in and around the capital, and is descended partially from Israelite and Sephardi immigrants. The remainder lives on the island of Djerba, where the Jewish community dates back 2,600 years.

The government grants Jews freedom of worship and pays the salary of the chief rabbi. It partially subsidizes the restoration and maintenance of some synagogues. It also authorizes the Jewish community to run private religious schools and allows Jewish children on the island of Djerba to share their study day between secular public schools and private religious schools.

Baha'i faith

The Bahá'í Faith in Tunisia begins circa 1910 when the first Bahá'í arrived, possibly from Egypt. In 1963 a survey of the community counted 1 assembly and 18 organized groups (between 1 and 9 adults) of Bahá'ís in Tunisia. US State Department in 2001 estimated the size of the Bahá'í community to be about 150 persons, but the corresponding report from 2018 stated there was no reliable information on the size of the community. However Association of Religion Data Archives and several other sources have pointed to over 1,000 Bahá'ís in the country.

Religiosity
The percentage of Tunisians identifying themselves as non-religious increased from around 12% in 2013 to around 33% in 2018, which makes Tunisia the least religious country in the Arab world according to the survey. In the survey, nearly a half of the young Tunisians described themselves as non-religious.

According to the Arab Barometer Survey, in 2018, 99.4% of Tunisians Identified as Muslims, while 0.3% responded with no religion and 0.3% responded with other.

The Arab Barometer found that about 46% of the Tunisian youth said they are not religious. 

However, as of July 2022, new surveys by the Arab Barometer say otherwise, particularly BBC's programme, The Newsroom journalists highlighting that the previously noted wave of those saying they were not religious has been, in fact, "reversed".

Freedom of religion

The Constitution of Tunisia provides for freedom of religion, belief and the freedom to practice the rites of one's religion unless they disturb the public order; however, the government imposes some restrictions on this right. The Constitution declares the country's determination to adhere to the teachings of Islam and stipulates that Islam is the official state religion and that the president must be Muslim. The government does not permit the establishment of political parties on the basis of religion and prohibits efforts to proselytize. Although changing religions is legal, there is great societal pressure against Muslims who decide to leave Islam.

In 2017, a handful of men were arrested for eating in public during Ramadan, they were convicted of committing “a provocative act of public indecency” and sentenced to month-long jail sentences. The state in Tunisia has a role as a "guardian of religion" which was used to justify the arrests.

The government allows a small number of foreign religious charitable nongovernmental organizations (NGOs) to operate and provide social services.

Notes

References